The black Amur bream (Megalobrama terminalis)  is a species of freshwater cyprinid  fish in the genus Megalobrama.

Geographic distribution
It is found in the basin of the Amur, Ussuri, Sungari Rivers, and in Lake Khanka.

Footnotes

References

Megalobrama
Fish described in 1846